Ahmed Salah Mohamed Hosni Hassan (born 11 July 1979) is an Egyptian retired professional footballer who played as a striker. He turned to acting in 2012, after he composed songs for Mohamed Hamaki and others in 2011. He appeared in TV Shows that includes Kalabsh, Al Fetewa, and Hawary Bucharest.

International goals
Scores and results list Egypt's goal tally first, score column indicates score after each Hosny goal.

1 Egypt goalscorer in Kenya is also accredited to Ahmed Hossam Mido.

Honours
Al Ahly
 Egyptian Premier League: 1997-1998

VfB Stuttgart
UEFA Intertoto Cup: 2000

References

External links

1979 births
Living people
Egyptian footballers
Association football forwards
Egypt international footballers
2000 African Cup of Nations players
2002 African Cup of Nations players
Al Ahly SC players
VfB Stuttgart players
VfB Stuttgart II players
K.A.A. Gent players
Çaykur Rizespor footballers
Al Mokawloon Al Arab SC players
Ismaily SC players
Egyptian Premier League players
Bundesliga players
Belgian Pro League players
Süper Lig players
Egyptian expatriate footballers
Egyptian expatriate sportspeople in Belgium
Expatriate footballers in Belgium
Egyptian expatriate sportspeople in China
Expatriate footballers in China
Egyptian expatriate sportspeople in Germany
Expatriate footballers in Germany
Egyptian expatriate sportspeople in Turkey
Expatriate footballers in Turkey